Zhang Tiequan, or Zhang Tie Quan (born July 25, 1978), often anglicized to Tiequan Zhang, is a Chinese mixed martial artist, who last competed as a Lightweight in the UFC. A professional competitor since 2005, Tiequan spent most of the beginning of his career fighting in the Art of War Fighting Championship in his native China, until he signed with WEC in the United States. He is notable for being the first fighter from China to be signed to the UFC and the first to win a bout with the promotion.

Background
Zhang began training in martial arts and Mongolian wrestling as a child and won the Inner Mongolian Wrestling Championships at the age of 16. After this, he was recruited to fight at one of China's top Sanshou academies where he was under the tutelage of Sanda coach, Zhao Xuejun. In 2005, Zhao convinced Zhang to move to MMA making him one of the earliest professional MMA fighters in China.

Zhang is also China's first-ever brown belt and black belt in Brazilian jiu-jitsu.

Mixed martial arts career

Early career
When the Art of War Fighting Championship, China's largest mixed martial arts organization, was founded in 2005, the company's founder Andy Pi invited a number of fighters from Zhang's academy to fight there. Zhang then took up mixed martial arts and won his first thirteen fights, over a five-year period, all by knockout or submission.

World Extreme Cagefighting
In August 2010, Zhang joined World Extreme Cagefighting, one of the largest mixed martial arts organizations in North America. He was expected to make his WEC debut against Alex Karalexis at WEC 51: Aldo vs. Gamburyan in September 2010. However, Karalexis was forced from the bout with an injury and replaced by promotional newcomer Jason Reinhardt.  Reinhardt was then also forced from the card after failing a prefight eye exam and replaced by Pablo Garza. Zhang won the fight via submission in the first round.

Zhang then fought Danny Downes on December 16, 2010 at WEC 53: Henderson vs Pettis, the WEC's last ever event before merging with the Ultimate Fighting Championship. Zhang tasted defeat for the first time, losing via unanimous decision (29-28, 30-27, 29-28).

Ultimate Fighting Championship
On October 28, 2010, WEC merged with the UFC. As part of the merger, all WEC fighters were transferred to the UFC.

For his UFC debut, Zhang dropped down to Featherweight and faced Jason Reinhardt on February 27, 2011 at UFC 127: Penn vs. Fitch. Zhang showed accurate counters in the first few moments of the fight before eventually attempting a guillotine choke which led to a submission victory just 48 seconds into the first round.

Zhang fought Darren Elkins on October 8, 2011 at UFC 136, and lost the fight via unanimous decision (30-27, 30-27, 30-26). Zhang repeatedly attempted unsuccessful guillotine chokes which left him on his back where he was unable to scramble and received punches and elbows for the majority of the bout.

Zhang was expected to face Leonard Garcia on February 26, 2012 at UFC 144. However, Garcia was forced out of the bout with an injury and replaced by promotional newcomer Issei Tamura. He lost the fight via KO in the second round.

Zhang returned to Lightweight is expected to face Jon Tuck in Macau on November 10, 2012 at UFC on Fuel TV 6. He lost via unanimous decision in a back-and-forth fight.

The Ultimate Fighter: China
In November 2013, it was announced that Zhang would serve as one of the coaches on The Ultimate Fighter: China, the China-based version of The Ultimate Fighter which began airing in December 2013.

Mixed martial arts record

|- 
| Loss
| align=center| 15–4
| Jon Tuck
| Decision (unanimous)
| UFC on Fuel TV: Franklin vs. Le
| 
| align=center| 3
| align=center| 5:00
| Macau, SAR, China
| 
|-
| Loss
| align=center| 15–3
| Issei Tamura
| KO (punch)
| UFC 144
| 
| align=center| 2
| align=center| 0:32
| Saitama, Japan
| 
|-
| Loss
| align=center| 15–2
| Darren Elkins
| Decision (unanimous)
| UFC 136
| 
| align=center| 3
| align=center| 5:00
| Houston, Texas, United States
| 
|-
| Win
| align=center| 15–1
| Jason Reinhardt
| Submission (guillotine choke)
| UFC 127
| 
| align=center| 1
| align=center| 0:48
| Sydney, Australia
| 
|-
| Loss
| align=center| 14–1
| Danny Downes
| Decision (unanimous)
| WEC 53
| 
| align=center| 3
| align=center| 5:00
| Glendale, Arizona, United States
| 
|-
| Win
| align=center| 14–0
| Pablo Garza
| Submission (guillotine choke)
| WEC 51
| 
| align=center| 1
| align=center| 2:26
| Broomfield, Colorado, United States
| 
|-
| Win
| align=center| 13–0
| Daniel Digby
| Submission (neck crank)
| Legend Fighting Championship 2
| 
| align=center| 1
| align=center| 0:30
| Kowloon Bay, Hong Kong
| Welterweight bout.
|-
| Win
| align=center| 12–0
| Caloy Baduria
| Submission (armbar)
| URCC 15: Onslaught
| 
| align=center| 1
| align=center| 4:21
| Pasay, Philippines
| 
|-
| Win
| align=center| 11–0
| Yonglong Zhu
| Submission (kimura)
| Ultimate Martial Arts Combat
| 
| align=center| 1
| align=center| 1:06
| Beijing, China
| 
|-
| Win
| align=center| 10–0
| Arthit Hanchana
| Submission (triangle choke)
| Xian Sports University: Ultimate Wrestle
| 
| align=center| 2
| align=center| 2:46
| Guangzhou, China
| 
|-
| Win
| align=center| 9–0
| Caloy Baduria
| Submission (guillotine choke)
| URCC 13: Indestructible
| 
| align=center| 1
| align=center| 3:03
| Makati, Philippines
| 
|-
| Win
| align=center| 8–0
| Malik Arash Mawlayi
| Submission (punches)
| AOW 10: Final Conflict
| 
| align=center| 1
| align=center| 8:48
| Beijing, China
| 
|-
| Win
| align=center| 7–0
| Erik Kalseth
| Submission (ankle lock)
| AOW 9: Fists of Fury
| 
| align=center| 1
| align=center| 0:49
| Beijing, China
| 
|-
| Win
| align=center| 6–0
| Seong Hee Kim
| Submission (triangle choke)
| AOW 8: Worlds Collide
| 
| align=center| 1
| align=center| 1:39
| Beijing, China
| 
|-
| Win
| align=center| 5–0
| Shashi Sathe
| TKO (punches)
| Art of War 6
| 
| align=center| 1
| align=center| 3:57
| Beijing, China
| 
|-
| Win
| align=center| 4–0
| De Gi Ji Ri Hu
| KO (punch)
| Art of War 5
| 
| align=center| 1
| align=center| 1:04
| Beijing, China
| 
|-
| Win
| align=center| 3–0
| Yun Tao Gong
| Submission (rear-naked choke)
| Art of War 4
| 
| align=center| 1
| align=center| 0:59
| Beijing, China
| 
|-
| Win
| align=center| 2–0
| Salvador Domasian
| TKO (punches)
| URCC 7: The Art of War
| 
| align=center| 1
| align=center| 4:48
| Quezon City, Philippines
| 
|-
| Win
| align=center| 1–0
| Zhao Yun Fei
| Submission (choke)
| Art of War 1
| 
| align=center| N/A
| align=center| N/A
| Beijing, China
|

See also
 List of current UFC fighters
 List of male mixed martial artists

References

External links

1978 births
Living people
Chinese male mixed martial artists
Featherweight mixed martial artists
Lightweight mixed martial artists
Chinese practitioners of Brazilian jiu-jitsu
Chinese sanshou practitioners
Chinese male sport wrestlers
Chinese people of Mongolian descent
Sportspeople from Inner Mongolia
People awarded a black belt in Brazilian jiu-jitsu
Ultimate Fighting Championship male fighters
Mixed martial artists utilizing sanshou
Mixed martial artists utilizing Bökh
Mixed martial artists utilizing Brazilian jiu-jitsu